Calochortus uniflorus is a species of flowering plant in the lily family known by the common names Monterey mariposa lily and large-flowered star-tulip. It is native to western Oregon and to California as far south as San Luis Obispo County. It grows in moist areas, such as meadows, in coastal hills and lower-elevation mountains. Most of the populations are found in the Coast Ranges, but some occur in the Cascades and in the foothills of the Sierra Nevada.

Calochortus uniflorus is a perennial herb producing a short, unbranching stem generally less than 5 centimeters tall. The basal leaf is up to 40 centimeters long and does not wither by flowering; there may be one or more shorter leaves farther up the stem. The inflorescence is a loose cluster of 1 to 5 erect, bell-shaped flowers. Each flower has three petals up to about 3 centimeters long and three shorter sepals beneath. The petals are white to pink in color and may have purple spotting near the bases. The fruit is a capsule up to 2.5 centimeters long.

References

External links
United States Department of Agriculture Plants Profile for Calochortus uniflorus
Calphotos Photos gallery, University of California: Calochortus uniflorus

uniflorus
Flora of California
Flora of Oregon
Natural history of the California Coast Ranges
Plants described in 1840
Flora without expected TNC conservation status